Jiesa Lake  or Gyesar Tso is a lake in Coqên County in the Ngari Prefecture of the Tibet Autonomous Region of China.

Location 
It is located southwest of Coqên Town. Fed by 27 small streams, it is 32.1 km long and 7.2 km wide and has an area of 146.4 square km.

References

Ngari Prefecture
Lakes of Tibet